The Men's club throw athletics events for the 2016 Summer Paralympics took place at the Estádio Olímpico João Havelange between 13 and 16 September. Two events was contested for the F32 and F51 classifications.

Results

F32
The F32 club throw was held on the 13 September and was open to only F32 competitors.

F51
The F51 club throw was held on the 16 September and was only open to F51 competitors.

References

Athletics at the 2016 Summer Paralympics
2016
2016 in men's athletics